Dr. János Hargitai (born 24 April 1958) is a Hungarian jurist, member of the National Assembly (MP) for Mohács (Baranya County Constituency V then III) since 1998. He served as mayor of Nagynyárád from 1985 to 1994 and from 2002 to 2010. He also functioned as President of the General Assembly of Baranya County between 2006 and 2010. He was appointed Director of the Government Office of Baranya County in January 2011, holding the office until May 2014. He became Chairman of the Committee on Immunity in September 2017.

Personal life
He is married. His wife is Dr Klára Hargitainé Pilári. They have a daughter, Linda.

References

1958 births
Living people
Hungarian jurists
University of Pécs alumni
Mayors of places in Hungary
Christian Democratic People's Party (Hungary) politicians
Fidesz politicians
Members of the National Assembly of Hungary (1998–2002)
Members of the National Assembly of Hungary (2002–2006)
Members of the National Assembly of Hungary (2006–2010)
Members of the National Assembly of Hungary (2010–2014)
Members of the National Assembly of Hungary (2014–2018)
Members of the National Assembly of Hungary (2018–2022)
Members of the National Assembly of Hungary (2022–2026)
People from Mohács